YKK may refer to:

 YKK Group, a Japanese  group of manufacturing companies, and the world's largest zipper manufacturer
 Yekîtîya Komunîstên Kurdistan, a former Kurdish communist group in Turkey
 Yokohama Kaidashi Kikō, a manga by Hitoshi Ashinano
 Kitkatla Water Aerodrome (IATA airport code), Kitkatla, British Columbia, Canada